The Loyola–Towson lacrosse rivalry is an intercollegiate lacrosse rivalry between Baltimore's Loyola Greyhounds of the Patriot League and Towson Tigers of the Colonial Athletic Association. The teams first met in 1959 and competed at the NCAA Division II level until transferring up to Division I in 1980 for Towson and in 1982 for Loyola. The two programs share locations on Charles Street and are separated by only four and a half miles. They also share cross-street rivalries with foe Johns Hopkins (see Johns Hopkins–Loyola lacrosse rivalry). Successful in Division II, both the Greyhounds and Tigers have had success at the national level in the first division since moving up. Loyola has appeared in four Final Fours and won the 2012 national title, while Towson has appeared in three final fours of their own, in addition to their 1974 Division II championship. Through 2020, Loyola leads the series by a 34–29 margin, the most-played opponent for both schools.

Series History

Division II Years (1959 to 1981) 
The series began in 1959, ending in a two-goal victory for the Greyhounds. Since that date, the rivalry has been played annually, with the lone exception being 1980. Loyola took seven of the first ten meetings, but the Tigers would dominate the 1970s, taking 11 straight matchups. This included a 20-goal thumping of the Hounds in 1974, the widest margin in the history of the rivalry. In '74, Towson would prevail in the 1974 NCAA Division I Men's Lacrosse Championship to claim its first national title, defeating the Hobart Statesmen 18–17 in double overtime. The Tigers would continue to make the tournament on a regular basis on legendary coach Carl Runk, while Loyola struggled to compete with Towson. In 1980, the Tigers would move up to Division I, accounting for the only interruption in the series to date. The following season, Loyola would down Towson 13–9 to end the losing streak and would finish the season as the national runner-up in Division II.

National Implications (1980s through 2000s) 
The very next year, Loyola moved up to Division I in 1982, joining the Tigers. The first contest at this level went the way of Towson and the following games would gain increasing significance. 1983 was the first between two ranked programs and would go the way of the Tigers. Both teams would make their first appearances in the Division I tournament towards the end of the decade. The 1989 affair was particularly notable as the first between two Top 10 teams, as #3 Loyola topped #8 Towson by five. The next five meetings would also be between Top 10 teams, highlighted by Towson's upset of #1 Loyola in 1992, a home overtime victory. On the national stage, the two teams enjoyed renewed success. Dave Cottle's 1990 Greyhounds finished as national runner-up and the following season would result in Runk's squad losing to North Carolina in the championship. A few years later, Towson would upset Loyola 16–11 in the 1996 tournament in their first postseason meeting.

After long stretches of continued success, both programs struggled at points just before and after the turn of the century. With Cottle's departure before the 2002 season, the Hounds missed their first tournament in fifteen years. The Tigers would endure a four-year tournament drought of their own between 1996 and 2001 before new coach Tony Seamen would lead Towson to another Final Four. In 2006, new head coach Charley Toomey took over for Loyola and would return to the tournament the following year, but neither team was viewed as a serious contender at the national stage.

Recent Years (2010s to Present) 
The rivalry's importance was renewed in the 2010s, particularly after the Hound's magical season in 2012, in which they defeated Towson 13–6 and won their first-ever national championship. New Tigers coach Shawn Nadelen quickly built a worthy competitor to Loyola, though the Greyhounds would get the best of their rival in the 2016 tournament to reach another Final Four. Towson would reach the semifinals the next year and, in 2019, would knock off another top-ranked Loyola, sending the Tigers to their first appearance at the top of the national polls in program history. Since 2008, Loyola has won 14 of 16 meetings, coinciding with their high-level success at the top of the collegiate sport. The rivalry records of the current head coaches, Toomey and Nadelen, stand at 12–4 and 2–8 respectively. This includes a dominant performance by the Hounds over winless Towson in 2020, with the nine goal margin representing the largest in the series in six years.

Rival Accomplishments
The following summarizes the accomplishments of the two programs.

 Loyola's 1979 and 1981 NCAA tournament appearances came at the Division II level.
 ^Towson's 1974 NCAA tournament championship and all six tournament appearances from 1974 to 1979 came at the Division II level.

Game Results

References

College lacrosse rivalries in the United States
Loyola Greyhounds men's lacrosse
Towson Tigers men's lacrosse